Trosia fallax is a moth of the Megalopygidae family. It was described by Felder in 1874.

References

Moths described in 1874
Megalopygidae